Crash Karma is the self-titled debut album by Canadian alternative rock band Crash Karma. It was released on March 16, 2010, through eOne Music. The world premiere of the album took place live on the internet on March 15. The first single, "Awake", was released on November 12, 2009. The album debuted at No. 38 on the Canadian Albums Chart.

Track listing
 "Like a Wave" - 3:47
 "Awake" - 3:57
 "Next Life" - 3:50
 "Lost" (featuring Ian Thornley) - 4:37
 "Fight" - 3:24
 "The Fire" - 3:39
 "Man I Used to be" - 3:46
 "Energy" - 3:52
 "On My Own" - 3:38
 "Not About Anger" - 3:17
 "Live a Little" - 3:34

Personnel
 Edwin – vocals
 Mike Turner – guitar
 Jeff Burrows – drums, percussion
 Amir Epstein – bass

References

2010 debut albums
Crash Karma albums
E1 Music albums